Colonel John R. Bourgeois is a former conductor of the United States Marine Band from 1979 to 1996, as well as composer / arranger of American music. Bourgeois also currently serves as vice president of the board of trustees of the Sinfonia Educational Foundation. He was initiated as an honorary member of the Zeta Pi chapter of Phi Mu Alpha Sinfonia music fraternity at Loyola University in 1956, and as a member of the fraternity's Alpha Alpha National Honorary Chapter in 1997. He was the fraternity's 2000 recipient of the Charles E. Lutton Man of Music Award, presented at its national convention in Dallas, Texas.

Colonel Bourgeois, who was born in Gibson, Louisiana, in 1934 and educated at Jesuit High School and Loyola University in New Orleans, served in the Marine Band under every president from Dwight Eisenhower to Bill Clinton.

Colonel Bourgeois has two sons, John A. Bourgeois, an attorney in Baltimore, Maryland, and Alexander S. (“Alec”) Bourgeois, a musician, artist, and web creative consultant in Washington, D.C., five grandchildren, and two great-grandchildren.

Music

External links 
 Marine Band profile
 

Living people
United States Marine Corps colonels
American male composers
21st-century American composers
American male conductors (music)
United States Marine Band musicians
Distinguished Service to Music Medal recipients
21st-century American conductors (music)
21st-century American male musicians
Year of birth missing (living people)